In astronomy, precovery (short for pre-discovery recovery) is the process of finding the image of an object in images or photographic plates predating its discovery, typically for the purpose of calculating a more accurate orbit. This happens most often with minor planets, but sometimes a comet, a dwarf planet, a natural satellite, or a star is found in old archived images; even exoplanet precovery observations have been obtained. "Precovery" refers to a pre-discovery image; "recovery" refers to imaging of a body which was lost to our view (as behind the Sun), but is now visible again (also see lost minor planet and lost comet).

Orbit determination requires measuring an object's position on multiple occasions.  The longer the interval between observations, the more accurately the orbit can be calculated; however, for a newly discovered object, only a few days' or weeks' worth of measured positions may be available, sufficient only for a preliminary (imprecise) orbit calculation.

When an object is of particular interest (such as asteroids with a chance of impacting Earth), researchers begin a search for precovery images.  Using the preliminary orbit calculation to predict where the object might appear on old archival images, those images (sometimes decades old) are searched to see if it had in fact already been photographed.  If so, a far longer observation arc can allow a far more precise orbital calculation.

Until fast computers were widely available, it was impractical to analyze and measure images for possible minor planet discoveries because this required much human labor. Usually, such images were made years or decades earlier for other purposes (studies of galaxies, etc.), and it was not worth the time it took to look for precovery images of ordinary asteroids. Today, computers can easily analyze digital astronomical images and compare them to star catalogs containing up to a billion or so star positions to see if one of the "stars" is actually a precovery image of the newly discovered object. This technique has been used since the mid-1990s to determine the orbits of many minor planets.

Examples 

In an extreme case of precovery, an object was discovered on December 31, 2000, designated , and a near-Earth orbit was calculated. Precovery revealed that it had previously been discovered on February 23, 1950 and given the provisional designation 1950 DA, and then been lost for half a century. The exceptionally long observation period allowed an unusually precise orbit calculation, and the asteroid was determined to have a small chance of colliding with the Earth. After an asteroid's orbit is calculated with sufficient precision, it can be assigned a number prefix (in this case, (29075) 1950 DA).

The asteroid 69230 Hermes was found in 2003 and numbered, but was found to be a discovery from 1937 which had been named "Hermes", but subsequently lost; its old name was reinstated. Centaur 2060 Chiron was discovered in 1977, and precovery images from 1895 have been located.

Another extreme case of precovery concerns Neptune. Galileo observed Neptune on both December 28, 1612 and January 27, 1613, when it was in a portion of its orbit where it was nearly directly behind Jupiter as seen from Earth. Because Neptune moves very slowly and is very faint relative to the known planets of that time, Galileo mistook it for a fixed star, leaving the planet undiscovered until 1846. He did note that the "star" Neptune did seem to move, noting that between his two observations its apparent distance from another star had changed. However, unlike photographic images, drawings such as those Galileo made are usually not precise enough to be of use in refining an object's orbit. In 1795, Lalande also mistook Neptune for a star. In 1690, John Flamsteed did the same with Uranus, even cataloging it as "34 Tauri".

One of the most extreme cases postulated is of the discovery of Ganymede. This again involved Galileo, who is usually stated to have discovered it in 1610. It has been postulated by Xi Zezong that Ganymede was discovered by the Chinese astronomer Gan De in 365 B.C., when he catalogued it as a small red star next to Jupiter during naked eye observation.

Dwarf planets 

Discovery and precovery dates for well-known dwarf planets, minor planets and probable dwarf planets:

Oort cloud comets 
As modern survey archives reach fainter magnitudes and are more comprehensive, significant precovery images have become easier to locate.

See also 

 Discovery image
 DANEOPS

References

External links 

 SkyMorph GSFC

Planetary science